The 2021 Saint Louis Billikens baseball team represented Saint Louis University during the 2021 NCAA Division I baseball season. The Billikens played their home games at Billiken Sports Center as a members of the Atlantic 10 Conference. They were led by head coach Darin Hendrickson, in his 13th season at Saint Louis.

Previous season

The 2020 Saint Louis Billikens baseball team notched a 10–6 (0–0) regular season record. The season prematurely ended on March 12, 2020 due to concerns over the COVID-19 pandemic.

Preseason

Coaches Poll 
The Atlantic 10 baseball coaches' poll was released on February 18, 2021. Saint Louis was picked to finish fifth the Atlantic 10 regular season championship.

Personnel

Roster

Coaching Staff

Game log

Notes

References

External links 
Saint Louis Baseball

Saint Louis
Saint Louis Billikens baseball seasons
Saint Louis Billikens baseball